John Garcia or Johnny Garcia may refer to:


Entertainment
John Garcia (dog trainer) (born 1981), star of National Geographic's DogTown series
John Garcia (singer) (born 1970), American rock singer
John Garcia (album)

Sport
Johnny García (born 1978), Mexican footballer
John García (footballer) (born 2000), Bolivian footballer

Others
John Garcia, Chilean national, one of the "Brisbane Three" accused of conspiracy in Queensland, Australia, in 1974, later acquitted
John A. Garcia (born 1949), entrepreneur and philanthropist in the American computer game industry
John Garcia (politician) (1928–2003), member of the Ohio House of Representatives
John Garcia (psychologist) (1917–2012), American psychologist

See also
Jhon García (born 1974), Colombian cyclist
Jon García (disambiguation)
Jonathan Garcia (born 1986), American speed skater
Juan Garcia (disambiguation)